Mercedes Won (March 29, 1986 - October 16, 2008) was an American Thoroughbred racehorse and the winner of the 1988 Hopeful Stakes.

Career
Mercedes Won's first race was on March 29, 1986, at Tampa Bay Downs, where he came in 8th. He captured his first win on July 23, 1988 at Woodbine.

In his first stakes race on August 6, 1988, he won the Swynford Stakes, then followed that up with his first graded win on August 17, 1988 in the Sanford Stakes. Mercedes win streak continued with a win in the August 27 1988 Hopeful Stakes.

Mercedes grabbed another win at the 1988 Grey Stakes, but would go winless until March 4, 1989, when he won the Florida Derby.

Mercedes competed in the 1989 Haskell Invitational Stakes in which he finished in 7th place. 

On August 26th, 1990, Mercedes won the Rochester Cup Handicap. This would be Mercedes Won's last big win, as he only won allowance races thereafter.

Mercedes Won's last race took place on November 6, 1991, with a third place finish at the Wadsworth Memorial Handicap.

Death
Mercedes Won was euthanized on October 16th, 2008 due to cancer.

Pedigree

References

1986 racehorse births